The West Swan River is a  tributary of the East Swan River of Minnesota, flowing to the Saint Louis River and eventually Lake Superior.  The West Swan River flows into and out of Snowshoe Lake and Kelly Lake west of Hibbing. Presently there are problems with flowage, due to obstructions in the river. The mines that have polluted the river have left it facing severe problems.

See also
List of rivers of Minnesota

References

External links
Minnesota Watersheds
USGS Hydrologic Unit Map - State of Minnesota (1974)

Rivers of Minnesota
Tributaries of Lake Superior
Rivers of St. Louis County, Minnesota